Aq Altin Rural District is a rural district (dehestan) in the Central District of Aqqala County, Golestan Province, Iran. At the 2006 census, its population was 19,030, in 3,925 families.  The rural district has 14 villages.

References 

Rural Districts of Golestan Province
Aqqala County